Dr. Dennis Hirota is a professor in the Department of Shin Buddhism at Ryukoku University in Kyoto, Japan.  He was born in Berkeley, California in 1946 and received his B.A. from University of California, Berkeley.  In 2008, he was a visiting professor of Buddhism at Harvard Divinity School where his studies focused on the Buddhist monk Shinran.

He has worked extensively as a translator and editor of Buddhist works.  He is particularly known for his translation work in The Collected Works of Shinran.  He has also published numerous books and articles, in both English and Japanese, on Pure Land Buddhism and Buddhist aesthetics.

Resources
The Collected Works of Shinran
Podcasts of a six-part lecture series on Shinran given at the Institute of Buddhist Studies at Berkeley.
Shinran, Barth, and Religion: Engagement with Religious Language as an Issue of Comparative Theology

Bibliography
Living in Amida's Universal Vow: Essays on Shin Buddhism [contributor] (World Wisdom, 2004)
Wind in the Pines: Classic Writings of the Way of Tea as a Buddhist Path (Asian Humanities Press, 2002) 
Toward a Contemporary Understanding of Pure Land Buddhism: Creating a Shin Buddhist Theology in a Religiously Plural World (State University of New York Press, 2000) 
No Abode: The Record of Ippen (University of Hawaii Press, 1998) 
Shinran: An Introduction to His Thought (Hongwanji International Center, 1989)
Tannisho: A Primer (Ryukoku University, 1982)

References

1946 births
Pure Land Buddhism
Living people
American Buddhists
American writers of Japanese descent
People related to Jōdo Shinshū
Buddhist translators
American Buddhist studies scholars
University of California, Berkeley alumni